Laura Agront Sánchez-Pimion (born March 14, 1965) is a retired female high jumper from Puerto Rico. She competed for her native country at the 1984 Summer Olympics in Los Angeles, California, finishing in 22nd place in the final rankings with a jump of 1.80 m.

Achievements

References
 sports-reference

1965 births
Living people
People from Aguada, Puerto Rico
Puerto Rican high jumpers
Athletes (track and field) at the 1984 Summer Olympics
Olympic track and field athletes of Puerto Rico
Puerto Rican female track and field athletes
Female high jumpers
Central American and Caribbean Games bronze medalists for Puerto Rico
Competitors at the 1986 Central American and Caribbean Games
Central American and Caribbean Games medalists in athletics